Ludmila Tsifanskaya (born 1949) is a chess player holding the title of Woman International Master.

She won the Belarusian women's chess championship in 1978, and the Israeli women's chess championship in 1994 and 1996.

She also played for Israel in the 32nd Chess Olympiad.

References

External links 

Israeli female chess players
1949 births
Living people
Place of birth missing (living people)
Novosibirsk State Technical University alumni